Marzena Hanna Paduch (born 7 April 1965 in Zwoleń) is a Polish politician. She was elected to Sejm on 25 September 2005, getting 7,838 votes in 17 Radom district as a candidate from Samoobrona Rzeczpospolitej Polskiej list.

See also
Members of Polish Sejm 2005-2007

External links
Marzena Paduch - parliamentary page - includes declarations of interest, voting record, and transcripts of speeches.

1965 births
Living people
People from Zwoleń County
Members of the Polish Sejm 2005–2007
Women members of the Sejm of the Republic of Poland
Self-Defence of the Republic of Poland politicians
21st-century Polish women politicians